Missile defense systems are a type of missile defense intended to shield a country against incoming missiles, such as intercontinental ballistic missiles (ICBMs) or other ballistic missiles. The United States, Russia, India, France, Israel, Italy, United Kingdom, China and Iran have all developed missile defense systems.

Definitions
 The term "Missile defense system" broadly means a system that provides any defense against any missile type (conventional or nuclear) by any country.
 Any mechanism which can detect and then destroy a missile before it can cause any harm is called a missile defence system (MDS).

The role of defense against nuclear missiles has been a heated military and political topic for several decades. However, missile defense is no longer limited to interception of strategic nuclear weapons. The gradual development and proliferation of missile technology has blurred the line between the technologies for the interception of tactical missiles (usually short to intermediate range with non-nuclear payloads) and the interception of strategic missiles (usually long ranged with nuclear payloads). High-performance tactical ballistic missiles carrying non-nuclear payloads now have the ability to affect strategic balance in conflict zones. Likewise, high-performance tactical missile defense systems can now influence force deployment strategies.

France, Italy, and UK

 The UK, France and Italy developed a programme called PAAMS (also known as Sea Viper in the UK) in the late 1990s. It was developed to arm the Horizon-class frigate (a joint programme between the UK, France and Italy). The UK dropped out of the frigate programme after collective differences remained unsolved, and instead decided to design and build its own Type 45 destroyer which would still use the PAAMS missile system. France and Italy, following this departure, incorporated a ground-launched anti-ballistic missile system into the plans, and developed SAMPT – a truck-launched anti-ballistic missile system which used PAAMS technology.

India
Two systems are in planning and testing stages. The air defence network has two principal components – the ‘Air Defence Ground Environment System’ (ADGES) and the ‘Base Air Defence Zones’ (BADZ). The ADGES network provides for wide area radar coverage and permits the detection and interception of most aerial incursions into Indian airspace. The BADZ system is considerably more concentrated with radars, interceptors, SAMs and AAA units working together to provide an intense defensive barrier to attacks on vital targets.

Ballistic missile defence

The Ballistic Missile Defence Program is an initiative to develop and deploy a multi-layered ballistic missile defense system to protect India from ballistic missile attacks.

Introduced in light of the ballistic missile threat from Pakistan, it is a double-tiered system consisting of two interceptor missiles, namely the Prithvi Air Defence (PAD) missile for high-altitude interception, and the Advanced Air Defence (AAD) Missile for lower altitude interception. The two-tiered shield should be able to intercept an incoming missile having a range of up to 5,000 kilometers.

PAD was tested in November 2006, followed by AAD in December 2007. With the test of the PAD missile, India became the fourth country to have successfully developed an Anti-ballistic missile system, after United States, Russia and Israel. On 6 March 2009, India again successfully tested its missile defense shield, during which a test "enemy" missile was intercepted at an altitude of 75 km.

On 6 May 2012, it was announced that Phase-I is complete and can be deployed to protect two Indian cities at a short notice. New Delhi, the national capital, and Mumbai, have been selected for the ballistic missile defence shield. After successful implementation in Delhi and Mumbai, the system will be used to cover other major cities in the country. This shield can destroy incoming ballistic missiles with range up to 2,000 km. When the Phase II is completed and PDV is developed, the two anti-ballistic missiles can intercept targets up to range 5,000 km both at exo and endo-atmospheric (inside the atmosphere) regions.

Apart from DRDO's endeavour to develop a potent missile defense, India is reportedly examining the Israeli Arrow, the Almaz design bureau's S-300 PMU-1/-2 and S-400 and the Antey design bureau's Antey 2500/S-300VM. India has procured a squadron of S-300V systems which are in use as an 'anti-tactical ballistic missile screen'.

India also purchased S-400 system from Russia for 5.4 Billion dollars in 2018.

Cruise missile defence

Defending against an attack by a cruise missile on the other hand is similar to tackling low-flying manned aircraft and hence most methods of aircraft defence can be used for a cruise missile defence system.

In order to ward off the threats of nuke-tipped cruise missile attack India has a new missile defence programme which will be focused solely on intercepting cruise missiles. The technological breakthrough has been created with an Advanced Air Defence missile (AAD).
DRDO Chief, Dr V K Saraswat stated in an Interview "Our studies have indicated that this AAD will be able to handle a cruise missile intercept,"

Furthermore, India is acquiring airborne radars like AWACS to ensure detection of cruise missiles in order to stay on top of the threat.

Barak-8 is a long-range anti-air and anti-missile naval defence system being developed jointly by Israel Aerospace Industries (IAI) and the Defence Research and Development Organisation (DRDO) of India. The Indian Army is considering induction of a variant of Barak 8 missile to meet its requirement for a medium-range surface-to-air air defence missile. The naval version of this missile will have the capability to intercept incoming enemy cruise missiles and combat jets targeting its warships at sea.  India has a joint venture for this missile with Israel.

On 17 November 2010, in an interview Rafael's Vice President Mr. Lova Drori confirmed that the David's Sling system has been offered to the Indian Armed Forces.

DRDO is also developing more defense systems like VL-SRSAM, QRSAM, Akash-NG and XRSAM.

Israel

Israel has multiple missile defense systems, covering the wide range of missile threats.

Arrow 

The Arrow or Hetz is an Israeli family of anti-ballistic missiles, partially funded by the US. It was designed to fulfill an Israeli requirement for a theater missile defense system. Development of the system began in 1986 and has continued since, drawing some contested criticism. Undertaken by Israel Aerospace Industries (IAI) and Boeing, it is overseen by the Israeli Ministry of Defense's "Homa" ("rampart") administration and the U.S. Missile Defense Agency.

The Arrow system consists of the joint production hypersonic Arrow anti-missile interceptor, the Elta EL/M-2080 "Green Pine" early-warning AESA radar, the Tadiran Telecom "Golden Citron" ("Citron Tree") C3I center, and the Israel Aerospace Industries "Brown Hazelnut" ("Hazelnut Tree") launch control center. The system is transportable, as it can be moved to other prepared sites.

Following the construction and testing of the Arrow 1 technology demonstrator, production and deployment began with the Arrow 2 version of the missile. The Arrow is considered one of the most advanced missile defense programs currently in existence.

It is the first operational missile defense system specifically designed and built to intercept and destroy ballistic missiles. The first Arrow battery was declared fully operational in October 2000. Although several of its components have been exported, the Israeli Air Defense Command within the Israeli Air Force (IAF) of the Israel Defense Forces (IDF) is currently the sole user of the complete Arrow system. Arrow 3 was declared operational on Wednesday, 18 January 2017.Development of the Arrow 3 began in 2008, and it was declared operational in January of 2017. It flies at greater speeds, and has greater range and altitude compared to the Arrow 2, intercepting balistic missiles during the space-flight portion of their trajectory. According to the chairman of the Israeli Space Agency, Arrow 3 may serve as an anti-satellite weapon, which would make Israel one of the world's few countries capable of shooting down satellites.

David's Sling 

David's Sling (Hebrew: קלע דוד, romanized: Kela David) is an Israel Defense Forces military system that was jointly developed by the Israeli defense contractor Rafael Advanced Defense Systems and the American defense contractor Raytheon, designed to intercept enemy planes, drones, tactical ballistic missiles, medium- to long-range rockets and cruise missiles, fired at ranges from 40 km (24.85 miles) to 300 km (186.41 miles). Development began in 2009, and it was declared operational in April 2017 with the Israel Defense Forces.

Barak 8 

Barak 8 (Hebrew: בָּרָק, lit. "Lightning"), also known as LR-SAM or MR-SAM, is an Indo-Israeli jointly developed surface-to-air missile (SAM) system, designed to defend against any type of airborne threat including aircraft, helicopters, anti-ship missiles, and UAVs as well as ballistic missiles, cruise missiles and combat jets. Both maritime and land-based variants of the system exist. It was developed by IDF,  Elta Systems, Rafael Advanced Defense Systems and India's Bharat Dynamics. Currently, it is deployed by Israel solely in the Israeli Navy, though land-based versions do exist.

Iron Dome 

Iron Dome (Hebrew: כִּפַּת בַּרְזֶל, romanized: Kippat Barzel) is a short-range artillery and rocket interception system jointly developed by the Israeli Rafael Advanced Defense Systems and Israel Aerospace Industries. Development began in 2005, and it was declared operational in March 2011. It intercepted its first rocket from Gaza in April of that year, and since then has had a success rate of over 90%.

Iron Beam 

Iron Beam (Hebrew: קֶרֶן בַּרְזֶל, Keren Barzel), officially מגן אור (Magen Or, lit. "Light Shield"), is a directed-energy weapon air defense system which was unveiled at the Singapore Airshow on February 11, 2014 by Israeli defense contractor Rafael Advanced Defense Systems. The system is designed to destroy short-range rockets, artillery, and mortar bombs; it has a range of up to 7 km (4.3 mi), too close for the Iron Dome system to intercept projectiles effectively. In addition, the system could also intercept unmanned aerial vehicles (UAVs). The system is projected to cost under $3 US per interception, and could become operational by 2024.

Russia

The Russian A-135 anti-ballistic missile system is currently operational only around the city of Moscow, the national capital, and is being augmented to protect major cities in Russia. The A-135 anti-ballistic missile system is a Russian military complex deployed around Moscow to counter enemy missiles targeting the city or its surrounding areas. It became operational during 1995. It is a successor to the previous A-35, and compliant with the 1972 Anti-Ballistic Missile Treaty from which the US unilaterally withdrew in 2002.

The A-135 system attained "alert" (operational) status on 17 February 1995. It is currently operational although its 53T6 (NATO:SH-11) component is deactivated (as of February 2007). A newer missile is expected to replace it. There is an operational test version of the system at the test site in Sary Shagan, Kazakhstan.

The S-300PMU1 and PMU2 can intercept SRBMs, and the S-300V and S-400 Triumf systems are capable of intercepting a multiple IRBM attack by all DF-21 model IRBMs. These air-defense systems have been purchased by Turkey, India, China, Saudi Arabia, and South Korea. Other countries which have also expressed interest include Iran and Belarus.

The enhanced S-300VM/VMK is capable of intercepting ballistic missiles with a range of 2,500 km re-entry speeds of 4.5 km/s, whereas the S-400 is claimed to be capable of intercepting ballistic missiles with a range of 3,500 km which equates to re-entry speeds of 4.8 to 5 km/s. A system designed to intercept warheads at 5 km/s has the ability to act as a point system against simple ICBM warheads which have a typical re-entry speed of 7 km/s. Apart from the main Moscow deployment, Russia has striven actively for intrinsic ABM capabilities of its late model SAM systems. Russian ground based theatre defence against ballistic and cruise missiles are centered on the in-service
S-300P (SA-10)
S-300V (SA-12A/B Giant/Gladiator)
S-300PMU-1/2 (SA-20A/B Gargoyle)
S-400 (SA-21)
S-500 (In development)

United States

The U.S. Sentinel program was a planned national missile defense during the 1970s, but was never deployed. Elements of Sentinel were actually deployed briefly as the Safeguard Program, although it was not national in scope.
United States has had in development a nationwide antimissile program since the 1990s. After the renaming in 2002, the term now refers to the entire program, not just the ground-based interceptors and associated facilities.

Other elements yet to be integrated into National Missile Defense (NMD) may include anti-ballistic missiles, or sea-based, space-based, laser, and high-altitude missile systems. The NMD program is limited in scope and designed to counter a relatively small ICBM attack from a less sophisticated adversary. Unlike the earlier Strategic Defense Initiative program, it is not designed to be a robust shield against a large attack from a technically sophisticated adversary.

As of 2012, this system is operational with limited capability. In early April 2013, the Pentagon announced plans to deploy 14 more Ground-Based Interceptor (GBI) missiles to Alaska in response to the North Korean threats to deliver nuclear weapons to the United States. A Terminal High Altitude Area Defense (THAAD) battery was deployed to Guam as well.

China 
China tested the FJ ABM in the Cold War but they were ultimately cancelled. The PLA has currently developed the KT series of anti ballistic missiles and also have adopted limited anti ballistic capabilities on the HQ-9, KS series, and HQ-16.

China successfully tested its exoatmospheric interception capabilities in a test in 2010 and also in a test in 2013, being the second of two countries able to do so. The anti missile technology is successful to this day. The BMD system was again tested on 8 September 2017 and was deemed successful.

Four versions of the S-300 are in service, the PMU, PMU1 and PMU2 and the navalised S-300FM Rif. Based on the S-300PMU1, the Rif equips the PLAN’s two Type 51C Luzhou air-defence destroyers enabling them to contribute to the protection of a coastal site against SRBM attack.

The S-300PMU2 has the best chance of intercepting an SRBM missile as it employs the 48N6E2 missile which has a warhead optimised for destroying ballistic missiles, and better kinematics compared to earlier 48N6 missiles.

HQ-9 may have some ABM capability.

However, it might be noted that on 11 January 2007 the Chinese successfully performed an anti-satellite missile test using a KT-1 missile with a Kinetic Kill Vehicle mounted.

New missiles, the HQ-19, HQ-26, and HQ-29, are being built.

Taiwan 
Taiwan operates the Sky Bow family of BMD systems. Development of Sky Bow I began in 1981 with deployment beginning in 1993. The Sky Bow II is an improved version of the Sky Bow I. Both the Sky Bow I and Sky Bow II use a common silo launch system.

In 2001 development of the completely new Sky Bow III system began with flight testing commencing in 2009 and deployment soon after. The Sky Bow III has a top speed of Mach 7. A naval variant of the Sky Bow III has also been developed.

In addition to the BMD force the Army operates the Antelope air defence system which has a significant anti-cruise missile capability. The ROCAF also operates imported Patriot PAC-3 batteries.

Other developments

Iran
Khordad 15 (air defense system)
Bavar-373

Japan

In 2018, the Japan Ground Self Defense Force (JGSDF), initiated their 54th year of Hawk system and missile training at Fort Bliss.
In 2016, the Japan Air Self Defense Force (JASDF), and also the Japan Ground Self Defense Force (JGSDF), initiated their 52nd year of annual live-fire missile launches at McGregor Range, New Mexico in Fort Bliss. The 2014 annual service practice of the PAC-3 Patriot missile demonstrated a 100 percent kill rate before a group which included the commanding generals of White Sands Missile Range (WSMR), and of the 32nd Army Air & Missile Defense Command (AAMDC). Every JASDF Patriot team participated in the annual exercise, which takes several months.

Since 1998, when North Korea launched a Taepodong-1 missile over northern Japan, the Japanese have been jointly developing a new surface-to-air interceptor known as the Patriot Advanced Capability 3 (PAC-3) with the US. So far tests have been successful, and there are planned 11 locations that the PAC-3 will be installed. A military spokesman said that tests had been done on two sites, one of them a business park in central Tokyo, and Ichigaya – a site not far from the Imperial Palace.
Along with the PAC-3, Japan has installed the US-developed Aegis ship-based anti-ballistic missile system, which was tested successfully on 18 December 2007. The missile was launched from a Japanese warship, in partnership with the US Missile Defense Agency and destroyed a mock target launched from the coast.

In the 2010s, Japan consulted with the United States to possibly deploy the Terminal High Altitude Area Defense (THAAD) system and a ground-based version of the Standard Missile-3 interceptors mounted on Aegis destroyers. In a joint US-Japan test of Standard Missile-3 Block IIa, a medium-range ballistic missile was successfully intercepted on 3 February 2017.  Japan's intention is to create a four-stage anti-missile shield. In 2020, Japan scrapped plans to buy the land-based Aegis Ashore system from the US, stating the system would be too costly and time-consuming.

South Korea

Like the UAE (see below), South Korea has agreed to deploy THAAD systems. The agreement was announced in July 2016.

Because a kinetic-kill defense such as THAAD destroys high-value incoming missiles by colliding with them, the missile system is defensive, and not for offense. The agreement came after a North Korean intermediate-range ballistic missile launch in June 2016; China has rebuked the actions of the involved parties, as destabilizing. South Korean military sources responded that a 12 February 2017 launch by North Korea represented a new technology, a 'cold launch' using compressed gas before the solid-fuel rocket ignition. This type of launch is a submarine-launched ballistic missile  (SLBM) technology. China responded to the North Korean launch by cutting off their import of North Korean coal, which is 50% of North Korea's income. On 6 March 2017, North Korea launched four missiles from Tongchang-ri, a known long-range missile site at 7:36 a.m. local time, one of which landed in the Sea of Japan (East Sea of Korea), with the remaining three missiles landing in Japan's economic zone. A fifth North Korean missile failed to launch.

That day, the first vehicles of a THAAD battery deployed to South Korea.  Two launcher trucks arrived at Osan Air Base, South Korea, on 6 March 2017. By 6 September 2017 the AN/TPY-2 radar, the fire control system, and all six launchers (with 48 THAAD interceptors) were fully deployed.

South Korea is also developing several indigenous short-range BMD systems, under its Korean Air and Missile Defense (KAMD) system scheduled to be deployed by the early 2020s.  (Korea Air and Missile Defense) is a multi-platform, short-range air and missile defense concept that South Korea has been developing since 2006 to enhance its protection against DPRK SRBMs, cruise missiles, and light aircraft. South Korea is developed the Cheongung Korean medium-range surface-to-air missile (KM-SAM), intended to intercept DPRK SRBMs and MRBMs at a relatively low altitude, similar to PAC-3. The Korean long-range surface-to-air missile (L-SAM), under development until 2023, will reportedly be similar to THAAD, operating in a high-altitude, terminal-phase intercept role against SRBMs and MRBMs.

United Arab Emirates
United Arab Emirates (UAE) has graduated its first two American Terminal High Altitude Air Defense (THAAD) unit classes at Fort Bliss in 2015, and in 2016. Its first live-fire exercises with Patriot missiles took place in 2014. The UAE is   "the first GCC (Gulf Cooperation Council) partner to possess an upper tier ballistic missile defense capability the THAAD weapon system," stated the US Army general who addressed this graduating class.

Criticism
Bruno Gruselle, in 2010, noted that French policymakers considered the 1972 Anti-Ballistic Missile (ABM) Treaty and the doctrine of mutual assured destruction to be the cornerstones of strategic stability. Some French analysts, notably Camille Grand, view missile defense as jeopardizing both the doctrine and the treaty, as well as risking a new arms race, which is reflected in the development of advanced missile defense counter measures and decoys as well as a higher number of and more maneuverable independently targetable reentry vehicles—as well as the intercept systems designed to defeat them.

Additionally, experts such as L. David Montague, retired U.S. Air Force General Eugene E. Habiger and Harvey L. Lynch question the reliability of these systems. Beyond the technical difficulties, which have been described as more challenging than hitting one bullet with another, all performance data is derived from experiments and scripted tests. Their effectiveness in an actual all-out war situation is uncertain. However, non-nuclear ballistic and conventional missiles have been used in recent limited regional conflicts to strategic effect. Several Houthi-fired ballistic missiles in Yemen have been intercepted by Saudi MIM-104 Patriot batteries, and Russian cruise missiles have been notably used in the Syrian Civil War.

Gruselle noted most French security experts doubted the technological feasibility of intercontinental ballistic missile defense. Some thought it foolish to spend huge amounts of money on unproven technologies that lacked operational or political usefulness. Instead, the French defense policy community viewed missile defense merely as an American "economic weapon" used to defeat the Soviet Union and win the Cold War.

The extant missile defenses are currently vulnerable to maneuverable hypersonic vehicles, which can maneuver at speeds high enough to defeat missile defenses. China is among the countries pursuing hypersonic vehicles as warhead delivery systems.

Yousaf Butt, a critic of missile defense, states in The Bulletin of the Atomic Scientists that "just as with nuclear weapons, the U.S. infatuation with missile defense will cause other nations to desire this expensive technology".

Russia's top military officer has threatened to carry out a pre-emptive strike on U.S.-led NATO missile defense facilities in Eastern Europe if Washington goes ahead with its plan to build a missile shield. Russian Defense Minister Anatoliy Serdyukov also warned that talks between Moscow and Washington on the topic are "close to a dead end." U.S. State Department special envoy Ellen Tauscher responded that neither country could afford another arms race.

See also
Anti-ballistic missile
Anti-submarine missile
Ballistic missile
Aegis Ballistic Missile Defense System
Nuclear strategy
Missile Defense Agency

Footnotes

References

External links
 Article on Missile Threat Shift to the Black Sea region
 Video of the Endo-Atmospheric Interceptor missile system test by India 
Video of the Exo-Atmospheric interceptor missile system test by India
 The Center for Defense Information has many resources on ABMs and NMD.
 The Federation of American Scientists A resource for technical data, full-text of key documents, and analysis.
 MissileThreat.com, a listing and descriptions of ABM systems around the world.
 The unofficial website of the Stanley R. Mickelson Safeguard complex contains relevant images and history of the Safeguard program.
 History of U.S. Air Defense Systems

Technological races